Kollankoil is a panchayat town in Erode district in the Indian state of Tamil Nadu.

Demographics
 India census, Kollankoil had a population of 8754. Males constitute 50% of the population and females 50%. Kollankoil has an average literacy rate of 60%, higher than the national average of 59.5%: male literacy is 71%, and female literacy is 49%. In Kollankoil, 7% of the population is under 6 years of age.

References

Cities and towns in Erode district